Pavel Alexandrovich Viskovatov (also: Висковатый, Viskovatyi; 6 December 1842 in Saint Petersburg, Russian Empire – 29 April 1905 in Saint Petersburg) was a Russian historian of literature, editor, pedagogue and librettist (his were the lyrics to Anton Rubinstein's opera The Demon, based on Mikhail Lermontov's poem of the same name). The Dorpat University professor of Russian language and literature (since 1873), Viskovatov devoted himself to re-discovering, compiling, and studying the vast and dispersed Lermontov's legacy. He prepared and in 1891 published in Saint Petersburg the first ever edition of The Works of Mikhail Lermontov. Featured here (in volume VI) the first ever comprehensive academic biography written by Viskovatov, has been used as blueprint by all the subsequent Russian biographers ever since.

References 

1842 births
1905 deaths
Russian literary historians
Russian opera librettists
Academic staff of the University of Tartu
Writers from Saint Petersburg
19th-century dramatists and playwrights from the Russian Empire
Mikhail Lermontov
19th-century historians from the Russian Empire
Russian male dramatists and playwrights
19th-century male writers